Coogan is a surname, of Irish origin, and may refer to:
 Amanda Coogan
 Brian Coogan, American musician
 Dan Coogan (1875–1942), American baseball player and coach
 Gwynneth Coogan
 Fintan Coogan (disambiguation)
 Jackie Coogan (1914–1984), American actor
 James J. Coogan
 Keith Coogan
 Mark Coogan
 Michael D. Coogan, American biblical scholar
 Richard Coogan
 Scot Coogan
 Steve Coogan (born 1965), English actor
 Tim Pat Coogan

See also

 Geoghan and variants (Geoghean, Gaughen, Googan, et al.)
 California Child Actor's Bill, known as the Coogan Act